Hugo Alexandre Lopes Soares (born 2 March 1983, in Braga) is a Portuguese lawyer and politician, who is a former president of the Social Democratic Youth, in office from 2012 to 2014. Hugo Soares is also a member of the Assembly of the Republic since 21 June 2011, having been elected for a second term on 4 October 2015.

References

1983 births
People from Braga
21st-century Portuguese politicians
Social Democratic Party (Portugal) politicians
21st-century Portuguese lawyers
Members of the Assembly of the Republic (Portugal)
Living people